The Táchira emerald (Amazilia distans) is a hummingbird described in 1956 by Alexander Wetmore and William Phelps as a new species from a specimen from Venezuela.  It is now considered an intergeneric hybrid between the glittering-throated emerald (Amazilia fimbriata) and the white-chinned sapphire (Hylocharis cyanus).

References

Amazilia
Birds of Venezuela
Bird hybrids
Birds described in 1956
Intergeneric hybrids
Taxa named by Alexander Wetmore